NECR (North East Community Radio) was a broadcast radio station based in Kintore, Aberdeenshire, Scotland. NECR was awarded an Independent Local Radio Licence in 1993 and started broadcasting in 1994. The station was totally independent radio station and was accountable to a small local board of directors. NECR broadcast from a studio on School Road in Kintore ( north west of Aberdeen). The studio was referred to on air and in the address as "the very nice shed" or "the shed".

The station announced on air that it would be closing at midnight on 15 August 2018 as a result of difficult trading conditions.

Frequencies 
The frequencies were 102.1 in Aberdeen and the surrounding areas NECR also broadcast online via its own website. The station was received in North East Scotland on 97.1FM, 101.9FM, 102.6FM, 103.2FM and 106.4FM depending on location and was also available on DAB from the Aberdeen Multiplex, however the stream was 64kbps mono only.

Programming
The daily programming included The Breakfast Show, The Mid Morning/Early Afternoon Show, The Afternoon Show, and Drivetime. Competitions regularly feature including The Brekky Brainteaser, Guess the Intro and The Afternoon Quiz. The programmes were presented in an informal rolling format and all programmes were conducted live. 

The station featured a range of music from 50's and 60's music to current hits. NECR also featured national & local news and a variety of local interest items such as the Lamb Bank, Farming Focus (during the breakfast show), The Pet File (for lost and found pets) and Recruitment Classifieds (job advertisements from local companies). The station broadcast live programmes between 6am and 10pm with automated music  broadcast throughout the night.

The station had a series of specialist programmes in the evening such as the "Ceilidh Hour" and Country Jambouree.
Former presenters include John Dean Gordon Bathgate  Colin Gale James Reid Duncan Mckay        Kevin Ritchie George Findlay  Kevin Sherwin George Milne

References

External links
 

Defunct radio stations in the United Kingdom
Radio stations in Scotland
Community radio stations in the United Kingdom
Radio stations established in 1994
Radio stations disestablished in 2018
Kintore, Aberdeenshire